Dina Zaman (born 1969, Kuala Lumpur) is a Malaysian writer whose works have been published in the media.

Life
Dina Zaman's childhood was spent in Japan, Russia and other countries. She studied mass communications and creative writing at Western Michigan University and Lancaster University respectively. In 2007 a collection of her columns for the online newspaper Malaysiakini.com was published in book form as I am Muslim.

In 2012, she published a collection of short stories, King of The Sea. (Silverfish Books, 2012).

She is now working on her second non-fiction book, Holy Men, Holy Women. The work in progress is serialised in The Malaysian Insider. The book seeks and will showcase people of faiths in Malaysia.

Dina Zaman has extensive experience in public relations and the media industry, as a consultant as well as personality. She has worked on campaigns and events, and worked over the years as a volunteer for NGOs.

She is also an award-winning writer of non-fiction, fiction and poetry. She has had media presence locally and abroad as a columnist since 1994 and commentator of current affairs since 2005. She has been quoted in the BBC and interviewed on Everywoman, a women's programme on Al Jazeera. She has helmed three columns: Off Our Backs (The Sun, Malaysia in 1995), Dina's Dalca (New Straits Times, 1996 to 1998) and I Am Muslim (www.malaysiakini.com, 2005 to 2006), which is now a book published by Silverfish Books. Her book is now a bestseller at Borders and Kinokuniya bookstores. Her latest book, King of The Sea, is longlisted for the Frank O’Connor Short Story Award. She contributes to The Malaysian Insider and The Star. She writes on religion, society and lifestyle issues, and is known to inject ‘a sense of humour’ in her writing.

She is a recent recipient of the API Senior Fellowship and will be based in Jogjakarta and Thailand by the end of 2012. She was also the recipient of the British High Commissioner Chevening Award in 1998 and came home to Malaysia in 1999 with an MA in creative writing from Lancaster University.

Works

Non-fiction

 Contributed to CEKU.org, and other publications
 “I am Muslim” – compilation of column essays, published by Silverfish Books in March 2007; published in www.malaysiakini.com from January 2005 to August 2006. The book is now a bestseller.
 “The Young and Ambitious” – Essay for The Road Ahead, a compilation of essays                by Malaysian writers, to be published in Australia, 2007
 Contributing columnist for The Star, and also The Malaysian Insider
 Columnist for NST, “Dina's Dalca” – 1996 to 1998
 Columnist for The Sun, “Off Our Backs” - April 1995 to December 1996
 Contributed op-eds for TEMPO Magazine (Indonesia), Halal Journal and various other publications

Fiction & Poetry
 “King of The Sea” – Silverfish Books, 2012
 “The Road to Elvis and Other Stories” – on going
 “The King of the Sea” published in SARE – the South East Asian Review of English, Journal No. 45, June 2003 (to be out in 2004)
 “Harakiri” produced by Chakra Works, October 2003
 Edited Silverfish Anthology 3 with Dr. Quayum
 Excerpt of novel published in NINETEEN, A Silverfish Book imprint, March 2003
 “And She Became An Angel” translated into Indonesian by Dewi Anggraeni, published in Pesona Magazine, October 2002
 “And She Became An Angel” – shortlisted for Ian St. James Award, London, 1999
 “Gula Girls”, a monologue for Talking AIDs, October 1999
 “Kuala Lumpur”  Sudden fiction published in EAST, a regional magazine, September 1999
 “Pickpocket” and “Snapshot of a family holiday” – featured in Manoa, University of Hawaii's literary journal, Summer 1999
 “night & day”, collection of short stories published by Rhino Press - July 1997
 “The Fat Woman”, Men's Review - November 1996
 “The Kacang Puteh and Assam Woman”, Men's Review - August 1996
 “A Drama”, Editor's Choice, National Library of Poetry – 1996
 “After The Doctor's”, monologue for AIDS Memorial Day - May 1996
 “How To Go To Heaven” and “Carpe Diem”, Third and Consolation Prize, SHELL - NST Poetry Competition – 1995
 “Why Did He Sleep With Me If I'm So Fat?” and “Penganggur Terhormat”, monologues for One By One, Dramalab – 1995
 “night & day”, Men's Review - November 1994
 “Philippa”, Skoob Pacifica Anthology Volume 2 – 1994

References

External links
 Review of I Am Muslim by M. Bakri Musa
 The Malaysian Insider
 The Star
 Silverfish Books

Malaysian writers
Malaysian dramatists and playwrights
Malaysian non-fiction writers
Malaysian novelists
Malaysian women poets
1969 births
Living people
Malaysian women writers
Women dramatists and playwrights
Women non-fiction writers
Malaysian women novelists
People from Kuala Lumpur
Western Michigan University alumni
Alumni of Lancaster University
20th-century non-fiction writers
21st-century non-fiction writers
20th-century novelists
21st-century novelists
20th-century Malaysian poets
21st-century Malaysian poets
20th-century Malaysian women writers
21st-century Malaysian women writers